Slateria is a monotypic genus of bugs, in the subfamily Micrelytrinae and tribe Micrelytrini; it contains the species Slateria granti from Myanmar.

References

Note and Links
 Slateria is a synonym of the Asian plant genus Ophiopogon
 

Hemiptera of Asia
Alydidae